C. J. Smith (born May 10, 1993) is a former American football cornerback. He was signed by the Philadelphia Eagles as an undrafted free agent following the 2016 NFL Draft after playing college football at North Dakota State. He has also played for the Cleveland Browns and Denver Broncos.

Professional career

Philadelphia Eagles
Smith signed with the Philadelphia Eagles after going undrafted in the 2016 NFL Draft. On September 4, 2016, he was released by the Eagles. The next day, he was signed to the Eagles' practice squad. He was promoted to the active roster on October 13, 2016.

On September 2, 2017, Smith was waived by the Eagles and was signed to the practice squad the next day. He was released on September 12, 2017.

Cleveland Browns
On September 15, 2017, Smith was signed to the Cleveland Browns' practice squad. He was promoted to the active roster on December 16, 2017.

On March 19, 2018, the Browns traded Smith to the Seattle Seahawks in exchange for a conditional 2020 seventh-round pick. However three days later, the trade was nullified after Smith failed his physical with Seattle, sending him back to Cleveland. He was waived by the Browns on April 12, 2018.

Denver Broncos
On April 13, 2018, Smith was claimed off waivers by the Denver Broncos. He was waived on September 1, 2018.

Salt Lake Stallions
In 2019, Smith joined the Salt Lake Stallions of the Alliance of American Football. The league ceased operations in April 2019.

In October 2019, Smith was drafted by the XFL to play for the Dallas Renegades.

References

External links
 North Dakota State bio

1993 births
Living people
African-American players of American football
American football cornerbacks
Cleveland Browns players
Denver Broncos players
North Dakota State Bison football players
Salt Lake Stallions players
People from Savage, Minnesota
Philadelphia Eagles players
Players of American football from Minnesota
Sportspeople from the Minneapolis–Saint Paul metropolitan area
21st-century African-American sportspeople